Meliha Archaeological Centre is a visitor centre and exhibition based around the history and archaeology of the areas surrounding the village of Mleiha in Sharjah, the United Arab Emirates. Built around a preserved Umm Al Nar era tomb, the centre details the excavations and discoveries made over the past 40 years at Mleiha and surrounding areas (including Al Thuqeibah, Jebel Faya, Al Madam and Jebel Buhais), particularly the important Faya North East find, which provides evidence that 'anatomically modern humans' were in the Mleiha area between 130,000 and 120,000 years ago. These finds point to the spread of humanity from Africa across the Red Sea to the Persian Gulf region, and onward to populate the world through Iran, India, Europe and Asia.

The centre was opened on 24 January 2016 by the Ruler of Sharjah, Sheikh Sultan Bin Muhammad Al Qasimi. The multi-phase eco-tourism development is intended in future to comprise accommodation, a campsite and an astronomical observatory, with a total investment of some UAE Dhs 250 million. It will also include the development of a 450 km desert park. The centre was developed by the Sharjah Investment and Development Authority (Shurooq).

History of Mleiha 
The widespread archaeological evidence unearthed throughout the Mleiha area dates back as far as the Palaeolithic period, some 130,000 years ago. This would place the habitation of the area firmly within the time when it is thought anatomically modern human communities first left Africa and started to expand globally.

Later, as the last Ice Age gave way warmer climates, graveyards and adjacent settlements have been found which point to Neolithic communities who lived there from 11,000 years ago, with finds of tools at the location consistent with the Neolithic Ubaid or Arabian Bifacial tradition of 5,000-3,100 BCE. Civilization evolved during the succeeding Bronze Age from 3,000 BCE onwards, with elaborate communal tombs found at Mleiha, including the Umm Al Nar tomb, a feature is notable by its absence at the nearby necropolis of Jebel Buhais which otherwise represents uninterrupted evidence of human burial throughout the known periods of human settlement in the area.

The centuries that followed witnessed the introduction of the underground falaj irrigation system and the cultivation of dates and other cereal crops.

The Mleiha period 

An extensive fortified compound, 'Mleiha Fort', nearby the site of the present archaeological center, was discovered in the late 1990s and is thought to have been possibly the seat of an ancient South Arabian kingdom dating back to 300 BCE.

The period from 300–0 BCE has been dubbed both the Mleiha period and the Late Pre-Islamic period, and follows on from the dissolution of Darius III's Persian empire. Although the era has been called Hellenistic, Alexander the Great's conquests went no further than Persia and he left Arabia untouched.

Mleiha is strongly linked to the Ancient Near Eastern city of Ed-Dur on the UAE's west coast. Macedonian-style coinage unearthed at Ed-Dur dates back to Alexander the Great. Hundreds of coins were found both there and at Mleiha featuring a head of Heracles and a seated Zeus on the obverse, and bearing the name of Abi'el in Aramaic. These coins match moulds found at Mleiha which, together with finds of slag at the site, suggests the existence of a metallurgical centre. Contemporary Greek manuscripts have given the exports from Ed-Dur as 'pearls, purple dye, clothing, wine, gold and slaves, and a great quantity of dates' and there is a strong history of trade between the coast and the interior. Similarities in burial rituals — of laying animals to rest with their owners — and vessels, decorations and small bronze snake figures have also been unearthed. Camels buried with their heads reversed are a common feature of both the animal burials at Ed-Dur and inland Mleiha.

A trove of some 409 Hellenistic era coins was unearthed, stored in a clay pot, at Mleiha in February 2021. The nine-kilo find was described as 'hugely significant'.

Mleiha represents the most complete evidence of human settlement and community from the post-Iron Age era in the UAE. A thriving agrarian community benefited from the protection of the Mleiha Fort. It was here, and during this period, that the most complete evidence of early iron usage in the UAE has been found, including nails, long swords and arrowheads as well as evidence of slag from smelting.

Visitor facilities and lodge 

Visitor facilities at the archaeological centre include the Bystro Café, a gift shop and a range of guided excursions.

Tours are offered from the Centre to nearby attractions, including the popular 'Fossil Rock', or Jebel Mleiha. A range of horse-riding activities target beginners as well as advanced riders. The centre has an education outreach program and also offers discovery packages for families, as well as hosting groups and corporate events.

Currently under development at the centre site, the Al Faya Lodge is a small collection of luxury hotel rooms with a café, pool and spa, based around outbuildings first constructed in the 1960s. The Lodge forms part of 'The Sharjah Collection', a range of boutique hospitality locations managed by Mantis Hotels, a joint venture between Shurooq and Mantis Hospitality.

One of a number of innovations being deployed to maintain the eco-tourism aspect of the centre is 'spray on roads'.

The centre is open to the public weekdays from 9am-7pm and weekends (Thursday, Friday) from 9am-9pm.

See also 
 List of Ancient Settlements in the UAE
Archaeology of the United Arab Emirates
Iron Age in the United Arab Emirates

References 

Exhibitions
Tourist attractions in the Emirate of Sharjah
Archaeological sites in the United Arab Emirates
History of the United Arab Emirates
Archaeology of the United Arab Emirates